Rear Admiral George Mphafi is a South African Navy officer, serving as Chief Director Operations Development at the Joint Operations Division.

He was the Officer Commanding of the South African Naval College until 2004.

He then served as Chief of Fleet Staff at Fleet Command before being appointed as Chief of Defence Foreign Relations with effect from 1 November 2004. This was followed by a stint as Defence Attache in Washington

He served as Chief of Navy Staff until assuming his current position in November 2010.

Awards and honours

 
 
 
 
 
  Conspicuous Service Medal

He was awarded the Conspicuous Service Medal by the New York National Guard.

References

Living people
South African admirals
Year of birth missing (living people)
Military attachés